Michael Scott Kimmel (born February 26, 1951) is an American retired sociologist specializing in gender studies. He was Distinguished Professor of Sociology at Stony Brook University in New York and is the founder and editor of the academic journal Men and Masculinities. Kimmel is a spokesman of the National Organization for Men Against Sexism (NOMAS) and a longtime feminist. In 2013, he founded the Center for the Study of Men and Masculinities at Stony Brook University, where he is Executive Director. In 2018 he was publicly accused of sexual harassment. He filed for retirement while Title IX charges were pending; no charges were subsequently filed.

Background 

Born into a secular Jewish family in New York City, Kimmel earned a B.A. with distinction from Vassar College in 1972; an M.A. from Brown University in 1974; and Ph.D. from the University of California, Berkeley in 1981 with a dissertation titled: Absolutism and its Discontents: Fiscal Crisis and Political Opposition in Seventeenth Century France and England.

Before joining the Stony Brook University faculty in 1987, Kimmel worked as assistant professor of sociology at Rutgers University from 1982 to 1986 as well as visiting assistant professor at New York University. He returned to his alma mater, the University of California, Berkeley, where he was visiting professor from 1992 to 1994. In the academic year 1992–1993, he was voted "Best Professor" on campus by The Daily Californian.

Scholarship 

Kimmel is considered a leading figure in the academic subfield of men's studies. He has written numerous books on gender and masculinities including  Men's Lives (2010, 8th edition), The Gendered Society (2011, 4th edition), Manhood: a Cultural History (2012, 3rd edition), and Guyland: The Perilous World Where Boys Become Men (2008). He has co-edited The Handbook of Studies on Men and Masculinities (2005) and Men and Masculinities: a Social, Cultural and Historical Encyclopedia (2004) which was named "Best of Reference 2004" by the New York Public Library. Moreover, he is the editor of a series on genders and sexualities at New York University Press. In 1992–1993, Kimmel founded the journal Masculinities which was associated with the American Men's Studies Association. The journal was a precursor to the journal Men and Masculinities which was picked up by SAGE Publications in 1998 and became one of the first academic journals focused on men, with Kimmel as its editor.

In 2004, Kimmel was one of 15 scholars chosen for innovative scholarship by the Carnegie Corporation of New York. His research title was "Globalization and its Mal(e)contents: The Gendered Moral and Political Economy of the Extreme Right".

In an article about a "fight club" in Menlo Park, California, Kimmel remarked that there was a sadomasochistic thread running through them, and said they "are the male version of the girls who cut themselves. [...] All day long these guys think they're the captains of the universe, technical wizards. They're brilliant but empty. [...] They want to feel differently. They want to get hit, they want to feel something real."

Personal life 
Kimmel is married to the journalism and media studies academic Amy Aronson. The couple has one son.

Accusations of sexual harassment and retirement 
Just before receiving the American Sociological Association's Jessie Bernard Award in 2018, Kimmel was accused of sexual harassment. Soon after, the American Sociological Association provided a statement by him to the Chronicle of Higher Education in an article that outlined unconfirmed allegations of sexual harassment. In this statement, he delayed receipt of the award, giving his accusers six months to file a complaint with the American Sociological Association's Committee on Professional Ethics. Kimmel filed for retirement as charges from a Title IX investigation were pending. No charges from Title IX were ever filed. Since that time one of Kimmel's former graduate students accused him of using outdated language to describe the trans community, discussing pornography in work-related settings, and assigning non-work related tasks to his advisees.

Selected publications

Books

Journal articles 
 
 
  Pdf.

References

External links
Faculty page for Kimmel Stony Brook University
Transcript of an interview with Kimmel in the PBS documentary No Safe Place: Violence Against Women, March 27, 1998

Articles online
"Gender Equality: Not for Women Only", a lecture prepared for International Women's Day Seminar, European Parliament, Brussels, March 8, 2001
"Gender, Class and Terrorism", The Chronicle of Higher Education, February 8, 2002
"Toward A Pedagogy of the Oppressor", Tikkun, November/December 2002
"About a Boy", Vassar, the Alumnae/i Quarterly, volume 100, issue 1, Winter 2003
"A Black woman took my job – Michael Kimmel argues that it is in men's interest to work for gender equality", New Internationalist 373, November 1, 2004
"Global Masculinities: Restoration and Resistance", Gender Policy Review

1951 births
American feminists
American sociologists
American social sciences writers
Men and masculinities scholars
Brown University alumni
Living people
People from Brooklyn
Postmodern feminists
Male feminists
Jewish American writers
Jewish American social scientists
Jewish feminists
Jewish sociologists
Stony Brook University faculty
University of California, Berkeley alumni
Vassar College alumni
21st-century American Jews